Thomas F. Donnelly (née Thomas Frederick Donnelly; December 13, 1863 – November 1, 1924) was an American lawyer, judge and politician from New York.

Life
He was born on December 13, 1863, in New York City, the son of Thomas Lester Donnelly, manager of the Grand Opera House, and Sarah (Williams) Donnelly. He attended the public schools and City College of New York. He graduated from Columbia Law School in 1884, was admitted to the bar, and practiced law in New York City.

Donnelly was a member of the New York State Assembly (New York Co., 32nd D.) in 1896, 1897 and 1898; and was Minority Leader in 1898.

He was a member of the New York State Senate (20th D.) from 1899 to 1902, sitting in the 122nd, 123rd, 124th and 125th New York State Legislatures.

He was a justice of the City Court from 1908 to 1912; and a justice of the New York Supreme Court (1st D.) from 1913 until his death in 1924.

Actress Dorothy Donnelly (1880–1928) was his sister.

Sources

1863 births
1924 deaths
Democratic Party New York (state) state senators
Politicians from New York City
Democratic Party members of the New York State Assembly
Columbia Law School alumni
City College of New York alumni
New York Supreme Court Justices